Sizani is a South African name. Notable people with the name include:

Sizani Ngubane, South African rural women's rights activist 
Stone Sizani (born 1954), South African politician

Surnames of African origin
African given names